Edward John Hearn (born August 23, 1960) is a former Major League Baseball catcher who came up with the New York Mets during their 1986 World Series championship season. He batted and threw right-handed.

Minor leagues
Hearn was drafted by the Philadelphia Phillies in the fourth round of the 1978 Major League Baseball Draft after attending Fort Pierce Central High School. After four seasons in their organization in which he failed to reach higher than the double A level, he was released by the Phillies on 7 January 1983.  However, he was soon signed as a minor league free agent by the New York Mets.

In , he led the Jackson Mets with a .312 batting average and tied for second with eleven home runs.

New York Mets
Hearn began the  season in Tidewater when Barry Lyons won the back-up catcher job out of spring training. Manager Davey Johnson, however, reversed that decision in early May, and Hearn made his major league debut with the Mets on May 17 against the Los Angeles Dodgers at Dodger Stadium. He went two for three with a single and a double off Bob Welch, and caught Greg Brock, who had stolen a base off him in the third inning, stealing in the seventh.

While Hearn was on the Mets' World Series roster, he was the only player to not make a post-season appearance. He remains one of the more memorable Mets in franchise history thanks to his backup role to future Hall of Famer Gary Carter during the teams' 1986 World Championship Season and his performance in the team's 1986 music video "Let's Go Mets Go".

Cone trade
On 27 March 1987, Hearn was included in a trade with the Kansas City Royals, along with reliever Rick Anderson and minor league pitcher Mauro Gozzo, which brought future star pitcher David Cone and minor league outfielder Chris Jelic to the Mets. In retrospect, with the all-star career of Cone and the journeyman careers of Hearn, Anderson and Gozzo, this trade is often listed as one of the most lop-sided in major league history.

Hearn was on the opening day roster, and was slated to be the Royals' starting catcher in 1987, until a serious shoulder injury ended his season only nine games into it. After rehabbing his injury, Hearn spent the start of the 1988 season playing in the Florida State League before returning to the Royals.  However, he only saw action in 7 more games, and for his career, Hearn only appeared in thirteen games over two seasons for the Royals, batting .257 with no home runs and four runs batted in.

Hearn spent the next four seasons attempting to get back with the majors while toiling away at AA and AAA in the Royals' and Cleveland Indians' organizations. Following 17 games with Cleveland's AAA team, the Colorado Springs Sky Sox, Hearn retired from baseball.

Personal life
Expecting to spend his retirement selling insurance in Overland Park, Kansas, in 1992 Hearn was diagnosed with focal segmental glomerulosclerosis. Hearn immediately underwent a kidney transplant and was required to take several types of medication on a daily basis. Due to the debilitating effects of the disease, and mood swings caused by the medication, in 1993 Hearn almost committed suicide, but was able to fight his way past it through faith and a chance request for him to give a motivational seminar. Finding a renewed strength, Hearn struggled on despite being treated for skin cancer twice, undergoing two more kidney transplants, and being diagnosed with sleep apnea (requiring mechanical assistance to breathe while sleeping) - all of which forces him to take more than fifty types of medication on a daily basis. 

Hearn currently works as a motivational speaker. In 2001, Hearn was awarded the prestigious Certified Speaking Profession designation from the National Speakers Association. He is the first and only professional athlete to receive this designation (only 8% of speakers throughout the world have received this distinguished honor).

Hearn also operates a charity: the Bottom of the Ninth Foundation, which is a mentorship program for children.

Hearn has written an autobiography entitled Conquering Life’s Curves – Baseball, Battles & Beyond. He resides in Shawnee, Kansas with his wife, Trish and son, Cody.

References

External links

Ed Hearn at Ultimate Mets Database

Kansas City Royals players
New York Mets players
Major League Baseball catchers
People from Stuart, Florida
Baseball players from Florida
1960 births
Living people
Canton-Akron Indians players
Peninsula Pilots players
Lynchburg Mets players
Jackson Mets players
Baseball City Royals players
Spartanburg Phillies players
Tidewater Tides players
Omaha Royals players
Kidney transplant recipients
People from Shawnee, Kansas